Sultan Samma (born 13 April 1986) is an Indonesian professional footballer who plays as a midfielder for  Liga 1 club Borneo.

International career
In 2009, Sultan Samma represented the Indonesia U-23, in the 2009 Southeast Asian Games.

Honours

Club
Sriwijaya
 Indonesian Inter Island Cup: 2012

References

External links 
 
 Sultan Samma at Liga Indonesia

Indonesian footballers
Living people
1986 births
People from Samarinda
Sportspeople from East Kalimantan
Persiba Balikpapan players
Sriwijaya F.C. players
Gresik United players
Persisam Putra Samarinda players
Bali United F.C. players
Borneo F.C. players
Liga 1 (Indonesia) players
Indonesia youth international footballers
Association football midfielders